M&L may refer to:

 Manchester and Lawrence Railroad, a former railroad company New Hampshire, United States
 Manchester and Leeds Railway, a former British railway company 
 Mario & Luigi, a series of role-playing video games

See also
M & L Samuel, a former name of Canadian metalworking company Samuel, Son & Co.
ML (disambiguation)
MNL (disambiguation)
L&M, an American brand of cigarettes